Elroy Turner (born 28 January 1951) is an Antigua and Barbuda sprinter. He competed in the men's 4 × 100 metres relay at the 1976 Summer Olympics.

References

1951 births
Living people
Athletes (track and field) at the 1976 Summer Olympics
Athletes (track and field) at the 1978 Commonwealth Games
Antigua and Barbuda male sprinters
Olympic athletes of Antigua and Barbuda
Commonwealth Games competitors for Antigua and Barbuda
Athletes (track and field) at the 1979 Pan American Games
Pan American Games competitors for Antigua and Barbuda
Place of birth missing (living people)